Alan Williams (9 June 19272 June 2005) was a British economist.

He was a professor of economics at the University of York and aided the development of health economics in Britain from the late 1960s to the mid 2000s. One of his papers was in 1997 deemed by experts to be the most influential book or article published in the 25-year history of health economics. Williams was an advocate of the quality-adjusted life year (QALY) as a measure of healthcare benefit and his work arguably influenced the creation of the National Institute for Clinical Excellence in 1999. A fellowship has been set up in his honour.

References

1927 births
2005 deaths
British economists
People from Ladywood
Academics of the University of York
Alumni of the University of Birmingham
Health economists